Van Hook or VanHook is a surname. Notable people with the surname include:

Kevin VanHook (born 1965), American comics writer and film director
Loretta C. Van Hook (1852-1935), American missionary and educator
Robert Van Hook (1960–2018), American convicted murderer executed in Ohio. .See also Execution of Robert Van Hook
Kendall Vanhook Bumpass (1809 – 1885) a cowboy and early settler
Caroline van Hook Bean (1879 – 1980) an American painter.

See also
Van Hook Township, Mountrail County, North Dakota, township in the United States
Van Hook, North Dakota, ghost town in the United States
Van Hook State Wildlife Management Area

Surnames of Dutch origin